Abacı is a Turkish surname meaning "tailor or weaver of aba" (a kind of coarse fabric), and may refer to:

 Muazzez Abacı (born 1947), Turkish female singer

See also
 Abacı, Amasya, village in the central (Amasya) district of Amasya Province, Turkey
 Abacı, Göynücek, village in the district of Göynücek, Amasya Province, Turkey

Turkish-language surnames